John Byrne was an Irish footballer who played as a midfielder and made one appearance for the Irish Free State national team.

Career
Byrne made his first and only international appearance for the Irish Free State on 12 February 1928 in a friendly against Belgium. The away match, which was played at the Stade de Sclessin in Liège, finished as a 4–2 win for Ireland.

Career statistics

International

References

External links
 
 

Year of birth missing
Year of death missing
Republic of Ireland association footballers
Irish Free State association footballers
Irish Free State international footballers
Association football midfielders
Bray Unknowns F.C. players
League of Ireland players